Fritz Egner (born 3 August 1949 in Munich) is a German broadcaster.

After working for the AFN in the early 1970s, Egner joined the regional broadcaster Bayerischer Rundfunk in 1978, alongside his two friends and colleagues Thomas Gottschalk and Günther Jauch. He became well known to German television viewers when he hosted the entertainment game show Dingsda between 1985 and 1994. He also commentated for Germany at the 1990 Eurovision Song Contest, hosted the ZDF show Die Versteckte Kamera between 1995 and 2003, and for Sat.1 viewers, the shows WWW – Die Witzigsten Werbespots der Welt, XXO – Fritz & Co and the German version of Tic-Tac-Dough.

Currently he hosts the radio shows Fritz und Hits and Stars und Hits for Bayern 3; in addition he also hosts the Christmas radio show Christmas Hits mit Fritz.

External links
  BAYERN 3-Urgestein
  Bayerischer Rundfunk at 60
  AFN Bavaria - The Tap Dancing Engineer | YouTube

1949 births
Living people
Television people from Munich
German radio personalities
German game show hosts
German television personalities
German television talk show hosts
ZDF people
Sat.1 people